Avafi (also Romanized as ‘Avāfī; also known as ‘Aveyfī and ‘Avīfī) is a village in Gheyzaniyeh Rural District, in the Central District of Ahvaz County, Khuzestan Province, Iran. At the 2006 census, its population was 714, in 131 families.

References 

Populated places in Ahvaz County